The 2001–02 Segunda División season saw 22 teams participate in the second flight Spanish league. The teams that promoted to La Liga were Atlético Madrid, Racing de Santander and Recreativo de Huelva. The teams that relegated to Segunda División B were Burgos CF, Gimnàstic de Tarragona, CF Extremadura and Real Jaén.

Teams 

 Racing Ferrol played some of their matches at Lugo's Anxo Carro Stadium. 
 Xerez played some of their matches at El Palmar and Juventud.
 Polideportivo Ejdio played the match against Numancia at Almeria's Juan Rojas Stadium on 27 October 2001.

Teams by Autonomous Community

Final table

Results

References

Segunda División seasons
2001–02 in Spanish football leagues
Spain